Han Seol (born July 15, 1983) is a South Korean football player who since November 2008 has played for Busan I'Park. (formerly Gwangju Sangmu)

Career statistics 
As of end of 2008 season

References

Korean FA Cup match result 

1983 births
Living people
Association football midfielders
South Korean footballers
South Korean expatriate footballers
Busan IPark players
Gimcheon Sangmu FC players
Goyang KB Kookmin Bank FC players
K League 1 players
Korea National League players
Expatriate footballers in Indonesia
South Korean expatriate sportspeople in Indonesia